Air Commodore (retired) Luke Chijiuba Ochulor served as the first Military Administrator of Delta State, Nigeria, appointed in August 1991 after the state was formed from part of Bendel State during the military regime of General Ibrahim Babangida.
He handed over to the elected civilian governor Felix Ibru in January 1992 at the start of the Nigerian Third Republic.

Ochulor is Igbo in origin. He was born in Okpofe Ezinihitte Local Government Area, in Mbaise Imo State Nigeria.
As state governor, he was tasked with establishing administrative structures for the new state while preparing for elections and transfer to civilian rule.
He created the Delta State University from the Abraka campus of the Bendel State University,
and set up a commission to determine if the new university should be moved to Anwai, Asaba, a decision that could cause ethnic unrest.

In July 2003 Ochulor called for leaders of the Ijaw, Itsekiri and Urhobo ethnic groups in Delta State to work together to create peace in the troubled Warri region. 
As a member of the Imeobi (inner caucus) of the Imo State Council of Elders, in 2009 he denied rumors that the State governor, Ikedi Ohakim was paying off to the elders to prevent criticism.

References

Year of birth missing (living people)
Living people
People from Imo State
Igbo politicians
Nigerian military governors of Delta State
Nigerian Air Force officers